Bahrain competed at the 2017 World Championships in Athletics in London, United Kingdom, 4–13 August 2017.

Medalists

Results
(q – qualified, NM – no mark, SB – season best)

Men 
Track and road events

Women 
Track and road events

Field events

References

Nations at the 2017 World Championships in Athletics
World Championships in Athletics
Bahrain at the World Championships in Athletics